Wang Jinlin (born 13 April 1972) is a Chinese modern pentathlete. She represented China at the 2000 Summer Olympics held in Sydney, Australia in the women's modern pentathlon and she finished in 20th place.

References

External links 
 

1972 births
Living people
Chinese female modern pentathletes
Olympic modern pentathletes of China
Modern pentathletes at the 2000 Summer Olympics
20th-century Chinese women
21st-century Chinese women